

Medal table

Men's events

Women's events

1991
Events at the 1991 Pan American Games
1991 in canoeing